Richard Davies M.D. (died 1761) was an English physician.

Life
Davies was a native of Shropshire. On 19 August 1726 he entered Queens' College, Cambridge as a pensioner, where his relation, John Davies was President. There he became a fellow, proceeding B.A. in 1730, M.A. in 1734, and M.D. in 1748.

Davies practised as a physician at Shrewsbury, and then at Bath, Somerset, where he died at the beginning of 1762. Elected a fellow of the Royal Society on 8 June 1738, he withdrew two years later. His will, bearing date 11 December 1743, was proved on 6 March 1762 by his widow, Jane.

Works
Davies was the author of:

 The General State of Education in the Universities: with a particular view to the philosophic and medical education: set forth in an epistle to … Doctor Hales, …, being introductory to essays on the blood, Bath, 1759. Anonymous Observations in reply appeared the same year. 
 To promote the experimental Analysis of the Human Blood. Essay the first (no more published), Bath, 1760.

He published a dissertation, Tables of Specific Gravities, with Observations, in vol. xlv. of the Philosophical Transactions, pp. 416–89.

Notes

 
Attribution
 

Year of birth missing
1761 deaths
18th-century English medical doctors
Fellows of Queens' College, Cambridge
Fellows of the Royal Society